War Dirsame is a settlement in Kenya's Wajir County.

References 

Populated places in North Eastern Province (Kenya)
Wajir County